Park Hyo-joo (born October 8, 1982) is a South Korean actress. She is best known for her leading role in the period police procedural Chosun Police Season 1 (also known as Byeolsungeom), as well as her supporting roles in the hit film Punch, and the television series Air City, Girl K, and The Chaser.

Filmography

Film

Television series

Variety show

Music video

Theater

Awards and nominations

References

External links

Park Hyo-joo at Yuleum Entertainment

South Korean film actresses
South Korean television actresses
South Korean stage actresses
Dongduk Women's University alumni
People from Busan
1982 births
Living people